Jean Arden Eversmeyer, known as Arden (1931-2022) founded both Lesbians Over Age Fifty (LOAF) and the Old Lesbian Oral Herstory Project (OLOHP) and was a mayoral appointee to the Houston, Texas Agency on Aging. After retirement, she dedicated her efforts to ensure that older lesbians have access to community resources and that their unique life stories are recorded and celebrated. Arden Eversmeyer died in Houston TX on 14 November 2022.

Eversmeyer realized and accepted her love for women while still a teenager. For nearly half her life she led a closeted life; at the time lesbians were expelled from schools and fired from jobs because of their sexuality.

Born to Herbert and Audrey Eversmeyer in Stevens Point, Wisconsin, on 4 April 1931, Eversmeyer graduated from Texas State College for Women in 1951; she later completed graduate work at Sam Houston State University. She worked in Texas public schools, starting in Plano; she spent the majority of her career with the Houston Independent School District, both as an educator and counselor for over 30 years. She met her first partner, Tommie Russum, shortly after moving to Houston TX.

After Russum's death in 1985, Eversmeyer began to volunteer openly with lesbian rights initiatives. She started Lesbians Over Age Fifty (LOAF) in 1987 to encourage a safe environment, meeting places, and a social network for mid-life and older lesbians. She also served on the steering committee of Old Lesbians Organizing for Change, a national network of women over 60 confronting ageism, and improving the lives of lesbians everywhere. After being with her second partner, Charlotte, more than 25 years, the couple got legally married in California. (Charlotte died on April 14, 2018). Today, Eversmeyer is proud to live in a time when she can be her true self with everyone.

In 1997, realizing that many of her friends were reaching the end of their lives, Eversmeyer founded the Old Lesbian Oral Herstory Project to "collect and preserve our life stories (focusing on lesbians aged 70 and older), to honor the lives of old lesbians." OLOHP offers outreach by sharing Herstories with isolated old lesbians and via education of senior care providers and the general public, to create environments that improve the lives of all old lesbians. Eversmeyer said, “You don’t have to climb Mount Everest to be interesting. Everyone has an amazing story.” The project quickly grew by word of mouth through friends of friends, as well as newsletter calls for interviews, to become more than a personal project. Eversmeyer began training others to extend the project's reach.  Project volunteers have documented over 750 diverse life stories recording the sacrifices and obstacles faced by lesbians of that era. The collection is now archived, and continues to grow, as part of the Sophia Smith Collection at Smith College (see WorldCat record).  OLOHP has published two books of collected interviews: A Gift of Old Age (2009; Purchase from OLOHP or borrow from a library (see WorldCat holdings); and Without Apology (2012; Purchase from OLOHP or borrow from a library (see WorldCat holdings).  
 
In August 2011, a room in the Montrose Counseling Center was dedicated to Eversmeyer, “whose achievements are too numerous to list.”

During National Women's History Month, March 2014, Eversmeyer was one of twelve honorees recognized for their contributions by the National Women's History Alliance.  The 2014 theme was “Women of Courage, Commitment, and Character.”

Mary Speegle, creator of The Lesbian Story Project, combines two interviews with Ms. Eversmeyer into a single 45-minute podcast published on 17 October 2016.  In The Lesbian Story Project with Arden Eversmeyer, Eversmeyer talks about the motivation for, development of, and benefits from the Old Lesbian Herstory Project.

In June 2017, Eversmeyer was selected to join Tony Carroll and Marion Coleman as Grand Marshals of the Houston Gay Pride Parade. Pride Houston cited Eversmeyer's efforts in founding LOAF, initiating the Old Lesbian Oral Herstory Project, and the donation of her personal library of lesbian books, music, videos, and memorabilia to the Texas A&M University library.

Honors and awards

 1981  Appreciation award from Houston School Counselors Association for 30 years service to children.
 1995  Houston Pride Committee award for community service
 2001  An Uncommon Legacy Foundation, Inc. -- Extra Mile Award for Founding Lesbians Over Age Fifty (LOAF) in 1987
 2004  Houston Zoological Gardens honors for 23 years service as a Docent
 2008  Old Lesbians Organized for Change (OLOC) honors for founding the Old Lesbian Herstory Project (OLOHP)
 2010  LOAF Founders Award as a Visionary/Dreamer
 2011  Proclamation from City of Houston for community service through LOAF and OLOC
 2012  Bold Woman Award, Bold-fest Conference, Vancouver BC
 2012  Proclamation from City of Houston on the 25th Anniversary of LOAF
 2013  Proclamation from City of Houston for founding the Old Lesbian Oral Herstory Project
 2014  Women's Trailblazer Award from the Department of Energy, Washington DC, "for helping women to excel with their similarities and differences in a complex world."
 2014  Honoree, National Women's History Project, Washington DC, "Celebrating Women of Character, Courage, and Commitment"
 2014  Featured speaker for Pride Month Celebration, Federal Deposit Insurance Corporation (FDIC), Washington DC
 2017  Grand Marshal, Houston Pride Parade, Houston TX

References

American LGBT rights activists
Activists from Houston
Living people
LGBT people from Texas
LGBT people from Wisconsin
21st-century LGBT people
1931 births